Renske van Beek (born 25 April 1989) is a Dutch para-snowboarder in the SB-LL2 category.

Life and career 
Van Beek sustained a cerebral infarction when she was ten, which left her paralyzed on one side. She started snowboarding because skiing was no longer possible. Through Bibian Mentel's Mentelity Foundation, she ended up in the U23 team of the Dutch Ski Association.

At the 2021 World Para Snow Sports Championships, van Beek won the bronze medal in the women's snowboard cross event. Along with Lisa Bunschoten, she also won the silver medal in the women's team event.

She represented the Netherlands at the 2022 Winter Paralympics in Beijing, China. She competed in the women's snowboard cross SB-LL2 and women's banked slalom SB-LL2 events.

References

External links 

1989 births
Living people
Dutch female snowboarders
Paralympic snowboarders of the Netherlands
Snowboarders at the 2018 Winter Paralympics
Snowboarders at the 2022 Winter Paralympics
Sportspeople from The Hague
21st-century Dutch women